= C. E. Matthews =

American Baptist evangelist

C.E. Matthews was an early pastor of Travis Avenue Baptist Church in Fort Worth, Texas. He "was recognized as one of the great pastor-evangelists in the Southern Baptist convention". Matthews took the church from less than 50 members to over 3000 in a 30-year period, beginning in the 1920s. He was director of evangelism for the Southern Baptist Convention Home Mission Board at a time when baptisms were being reported in record numbers. A former accountant and baseball player, he converted to Christianity in his early 30s. Matthews believed that either personal or mass evangelism were the only two forms of evangelism, and that mass evangelism was the most productive.

Matthews was noted for urging the Southern Baptist associations to "extend an invitation" and include all Baptist groups "regardless of race or color."
